Clifton Hall Girls' Grammar School was a girls grammar school at Clifton Hall, in Clifton, Nottingham.

History
There were two buildings: the old Clifton Hall and a new building further up in the grounds, this latter housed the school's Science dapartment, Art rooms and Assembly Hall. Clifton Hall had some great rooms, for example the well-known, "Red Room" (whose ceiling featured the Clifton family's many coats of arms) and was reputed to be haunted; a reputation, perhaps, deriving from the intense, almost claustrophobic depth of vermillion paint used in this room. The head teacher at the school when it first opened was Miss Heron; she died of cancer around 1970.  She was succeeded by Miss Squire.

On 13 January 1970, sixth-former 17-year-old Sandra Simpkin married 22-year-old Alan Barnes, a window cleaner, at a register office. She was given a day off lessons to attend the ceremony. Marriages such as sixth-formers at school were and still are rare.

Closure
When the school finally closed in July 1976, a large model of a Phoenix - (the school's emblem) - was burnt to signify the end of the school. The uniform was all purple, skirt, blazer, purple/yellow tie and a white blouse.  On closing, the buildings became part of Nottingham Trent University. In 2004 they were up for sale for £500,000.

Nearby to the school is a cliff that overlooks the River Trent. It is said that a lady of the Clifton family jumped off the cliff and died when she was jilted by her lover.

Notable alumni
 Jayne Torvill, ice-skater

Educational institutions established in 1958
Girls' schools in Nottinghamshire
Defunct grammar schools in England
Educational institutions disestablished in 1976
1958 establishments in England
Defunct schools in Nottingham
1976 disestablishments in England
Clifton, Nottinghamshire